Robert Herman Flock (born November 4, 1956) is an American prelate of the Roman Catholic Church who serves as bishop of the Roman Catholic Diocese of San Ignacio de Velasco, Bolivia.

Biography
Born in Sparta, Wisconsin, Flock was ordained to the priesthood on July 9, 1982, for the Roman Catholic Diocese of La Crosse, Wisconsin. Flock received theological training from St. Francis de Salles College Seminary, as well as from the Pontifical North American College and the Pontifical Gregorian University in Rome, where he received a degree in Biblical Theology.

Flock arrived in Bolivia in 1988, where he began missionary work and priestly ministry in Santa Cruz. He was appointed Assistant Vicar for the Parish of Santa Cruz, and was responsible for pastoral vocations.

On October 31, 2012, Pope Benedict XVI appointed him to be titular bishop of Forum Popilii, today Forlimpopoli, near Forlì, in Italy, and auxiliary bishop of the Archdiocese of Cochabamba. On November 4, 2016, Pope Francis appointed him as bishop of San Ignacio de Velasco.

Flock was consecrated bishop on January 17, 2013 by Tito Solari Capellari, S.D.B., archbishop of Cochabamba, in the Cathedral of San Sebastián.

Flock has been a long-time critic of former President Morales and the wider Movement for Socialism accusing them of violence, racism, and dividing the country.

References

1956 births
Living people
People from Sparta, Wisconsin
Roman Catholic Diocese of La Crosse
21st-century Roman Catholic bishops in Bolivia
Catholics from Wisconsin
21st-century American Roman Catholic priests
Roman Catholic bishops of Cochabamba